Ishq Zahe Naseeb is a Pakistani mystery drama television series co-produced by Momina Duraid and Moomal Shunaid under MD Productions and Moomal Entertainment which started on Hum TV from 21 June 2019. The series focuses on dissociative identity disorder, portrayed by Zahid Ahmed along with Sonya Hussain and Sami Khan in lead role whereas Zarnish Khan and Jinaan Hussain in pivot roles. It also has Yumna Zaidi and Azekah Daniel in an extended cameo appearance. The series received critical praise, with Ahmed and Zaidi both noted for their performances, especially Ahmed's performance. At 19th Lux Style Awards, it received six nominations with winning an award of Best Actor - Critics for Ahmed.

Plot

Gohar is a poor but happy girl who is in love with a boy named Kashif. Kashif too is serious about her and intends to marry her. However, one day they are spotted together by Gohar’s brother Saleem, which creates problems for Gohar. Consequently, she is forced to accept the proposal of a nasty cousin Jehangir, because her father owes them money. Gohar and Kashif, on Gohar's sister's advice decide to elope, but on the day of the marriage, both of them return halfway due to familial obligations, and avoid contact with each other.

Meanwhile, Sameer is a wealthy, handsome, and young businessman whose mother abandoned him when he was a child and his father died soon after. He was then raised by his step-mother Sabiha. Due to traumatic experiences in his childhood, he developed split personality disorder, which has been kept a secret between him and Sabiha. He got engaged to a girl named Zoya whom he loved and hoped would help him get over his issues, but she died mysteriously before their marriage.

Gohar’s sister Bushra works as a receptionist at Sameer's office, and Gohar takes her place when Bushra gets married and resigns. She is instead assigned as a governess at Sameer’s house, where Sabiha grows fond of her. Gohar doesn’t tell her family that she is working at Sameer’s house instead of his office, to avoid problems. Jehangir eventually finds out and tells her family who bar her from working anymore.

Sameer, realizing that his mother has adapted to Gohar's way of managing the house, comes to her house to request her to rejoin. When he learns of the family’s debt and Jehangir's pressure on the family, he writes her a blank cheque in hopes that it will get her to come back. Gohar refuses, but Saleem accepts the cheque, and withdraws money, twice the amount loan was for. He pays back the loan and keeps the rest of the extra withdrawal for himself. He also breaks Jehangir and Gohars engagement.

Jehangir chooses to take revenge by attempting to throw acid on Gohar's face but fails. He is jailed but comes out after some time on bail.

Meanwhile, Kashif secures a good position in Sameer's rival company and starts earning well. His boss Donia is a woman who uses a wheelchair and is bitter because her fiance left her. Kashif slowly helps her mend her trust and bring back her liveliness and she is able to walk again. Their relationship blossoms, as does Sameer and Gohars.

Sabiha, fearing that Gohar is trying to trap Sameer, fires her as governess. In retaliation, Sameer gives her a position in his office, to work on an upcoming project with Donia’s company. A subsequent meeting between the two companies leads to Gohar meeting Kashif after a long time. But neither of them speak about their failed attempt to marry each other, making themselves believe that they betrayed each other.

Sabiha learns that Gohar is working at Sameer’s office and arrives to humiliate and demean her, hoping she’ll leave. In an attempt to save her respect, Sameer announces that he is engaged to Gohar, silencing his mother. Later, during a dinner, he tells Gohar that he truly likes her and formally proposes to her. Gohar, on seeing Kashif, accepts the proposal. This is witnessed by Kashif and Donia who also happen to be there. Sameer comes to Gohar’s house with his proposal, and on her family's acceptance, gets engaged to her. On the other hand, the same day, Kashif gets engaged to Donia.

Saleem meets secretly with Sameer and gives him a list of materialistic things he wants under the pretense that it’s for Gohar’s security, in exchange for Gohar’s wedding with him. Sameer agrees on the condition that after the wedding, Saleem and his family should maintain no contact with Gohar. Saleem agrees reluctantly.

Despite Kashif wanting Gohar to marry him, she marries Sameer and on the wedding night comes face to face with his other female personality, Sameera. At a hospital, she also discovers Sameer’s real mother, Suraiya, now in a vegetative state, who was presumed dead. Following her, she finds out her brother is Akbar Chacha, a cook who works at Sameer’s house. He tells her that Sabiha drove Suraiya out of the house after framing her of cheating on her husband and led everyone to believe she died. She also meets with Sameer’s doctor who tells her about his mental illness and hallucinations.

A series of flashbacks show the story of a woman named Shakra, who was a maid at Sameer's house. Shakra got raped by Ehsaan, Sameer's father and as a result, Shakra gave birth to a baby boy. The boy was ordered to be killed, and Shakra got mentally disturbed. She was thrown out of the house. A few years later, Ehsaan threw his wife, Suraiya, out of the house accusing her of cheating on him and married a greedy woman named Sabiha who worked as a secretary in his office. Shakra returns from the mental asylum where she may have been sexually abused and poisons Ehsaan as a revenge for killing her child and raping her. Shakra returns to work in the house.

Sabiha starts to lock both Sameer and Shakra in the exact basement where Shakra was raped. While Shakra looks after Sameer, due to her own mental health issue, she poisons Sameer against men. Shakra starts to obsess over Sameer and begins to dress him up as a girl, calling him Sameera, developing his disorder of split personality. One day, Sabiha discovers this, and thinks of Shakra as a characterless woman as she is obsessing over him. Sabiha has Shakra arrested and sent to jail. Sabiha comes to visit her, presumably when she discovers Sameer's disorder. Shakra tells her how she killed Ehsan but makes Sabiha promise not to tell Sameer as he loves her and she loves him. Later, flashback shows that her baby was not killed, but was taken by Ehsan's bodyguard who embraced the baby after not being able to kill the child as ordered. Therefore, bodyguard lies to Ehsan that the baby has been killed.

It is later shown in the drama that Shakra is the illusion which Sameer sees because of his traumatic past.

Gohar leaves Sameer a note asking him to visit the old home where his mother is. When he reaches there, he comes face to face with Akbar Chacha who tells him the truth about his mother. However, before Sameer can meet Suraiya, she dies.

On the other hand, Donia becomes distrustful of Kashif after discovering the truth about him and Gohar.

Jehangir meets with Sabiha to discuss how to separate Gohar and Sameer. As part of the plan, he shows Sameer pictures of Gohar with Kashif, leading him to believe she is unfaithful and after his wealth. That night, in his disturbed state of mind and under the influence of his other personality, he points a gun at Gohar and then at himself. Gohar attempts to take the gun from him, but a shot is fired during the struggle that injures Sameer. He is hospitalized as a result while Gohar is arrested.

When Sameer gains consciousness he tells the police that it wasn’t Gohar who had fired the shot, but himself. He also admits to pushing Zoya off the balcony in his house under the influence of his other personality, that led to her death. Gohar is released from jail due to Sameer’s testimony, and court rules Sameer innocent for Zoya’s murder due to his mental illness and asks him to enter a facility for treatment. Jehangir is thrown in jail for his crimes, while Sabiha commits suicide.

Sameer wants to set Gohar free and asks her to sign the divorce papers, but she refuses. She meets with Zoya’s cousin, who although doesn’t forgive Sameer for her death, she understands that he didn’t mean for it to happen.

The series ends with Donia and Kashif reuniting after their misconceptions are cleared and with Gohar's blessing. Whereas, a mentally stable and healed Sameer reunites with Gohar at a mazaar, years later.

Cast
 Zahid Ahmed as Sameer/Sameera (Sameera is his female personality counterpart, as he has dissociative identity disorder)
 Sonya Hussain as Gauhar Rasheed, ex-girlfriend of Kashif and wife of Sameer
 Sami Khan as Kashif, ex-boyfriend of Gauhar and husband of Donia
 Zarnish Khan as Donia, fiancé of Kashif
 Yumna Zaidi as Shakra, Sameer's maid during his childhood and his split personality character.
 Jinaan Hussain as Bushra, Gauhar's sister 
 Azekah Daniel as Zoya, ex-fiancé of Sameer
 Ismat Zaidi as Sabiha, Sameer's step-mother
 Khalid Malik as Jehangir, Gauhar's ex-fiancé
 Humaira Bano as Gohar's mother
 Beena Chaudhary as Kashif's mother
 Akbar Subhani as Khursheed, Gohar's father
 Saad Azhar as Saleem, Gohar’s brother 
 Hajra Khan as Zakiya, Saleem's wife
 Ghazala Butt as Gohar's aunt and Jehangir’s mother
 Akbar Islam as Qayyum, Jehangir's father
 Raeed Muhammad Alam as Farhan, Donia's ex-fiance
 Manzoor Qureshi as Mr. Jabbar, Donia's father and Kashif's boss
 Aliya Jamshed as Bushra's mother-in-law
 Rabab Zaidi as Sabiha (young)

Production 
To portray the victim of a dissociate personality disorder, Ahmed had to portray the female part for which he was inspired by the Moin Akhtar's titular in Rozi.

Casting
The extended cameo role of Shakra before offered to Zaidi was earlier offered to Ayeza Khan and Neelam Muneer who rejected it due lesser screen time, being a cameo role.  It was the fifth on-screen appearance of Ahmed and Zaidi after Jugnoo, Zara Yaad Kar, Pukaar and Choti Choti Batain.

Soundtrack

The official soundtrack of the serial has been composed and performed by Naveed Nashad while the lyrics were written by Hashim Nadeem.

Reception

Critical reception
The series received critical acclaim due to its storyline and performances of the lead cast especially Zahid Ahmed and Yumna Zaidi.

Ahmed's performance as a victim of split personality disorder was highly praised and well-received critically. Critics also praised the performance of Zaidi, who played the alter ego of the victim. Mysterious and thrilling storyline of the series and its portrayal about mental health was lauded heavily by critics. Express Tribune listed it among the dramas that broke the stereotypes due to the portrayal of taboo topics such as Acid attacks, split personality disorder, sexual abuse and other mental issues. The Daily Times however commented on the storyline that it has normalised the rape.

Television ratings
The series mostly received 5-6 TRPs during its run.

Awards and nominations

References

External links
Official website

Pakistani drama television series
2019 Pakistani television series debuts
2019 Pakistani television series endings
Urdu-language television shows
Hum TV original programming